The 1964 United States Senate election in Maine was held on November 3, 1964. Incumbent Democrat Edmund Muskie was re-elected to a second term in office over Republican U.S. Representative Clifford McIntire. This was the first senate race for this particular seat in which the election was held in November and not September.

Democratic primary

Candidates 
Edmund Muskie, incumbent Senator since 1959

Results 
Senator Muskie was unopposed for re-nomination.

Republican primary

Candidates 
Clifford McIntire, U.S. Representative from Perham

Results 
Representative McIntire was unopposed for the Republican nomination.

General election

Candidates
Edmund Muskie, Democratic
Clifford McIntire, Republican

Results

References

1964
Maine
United States Senate